Adam K & Soha are a Canadian DJ and music production duo comprising Adam Kershen and Soha Radjpoust. They are based in Toronto, Ontario, Canada and specialize in progressive house music.

The duo has released a number of singles including "Twilight" on Adam K's label Hotbox Digital Music as well as numerous remixes for other artists including Kaskade, Benny Benassi, Tomcraft, and U2.

Biography

History
Adam K. & Soha first met in junior high school and began jamming together and playing music in local bands. Adam began working with studio equipment and discovered a talent for creating electronic music. Soha trained on multiple instruments and pursued composing and writing his own songs and music. Soha graduated from Humber College's Jazz Music program specializing in piano.

The duo teamed up in 2006 to begin working on original progressive house tracks. Their 2007 release "Twilight" became their most successful single to date. The single peaked at #2 on the Beatport Top 100 chart and being named an "Essential New Tune" by BBC Radio 1's Pete Tong. A nomination for Best Progressive House Artist followed at the 2009 Beatport Music Awards as did a period of prolific remix work for some of the world's top artists including "4 AM" - Kaskade, "Come Fly Away" - Benny Benassi, "Loneliness" - Tomcraft, "From The Speaker" - Mark Knight. More singles followed including "Long Distance", "Questions EP", "Save Us Now EP" and "Circadian Rhythm".

In 2013 the duo took a break from collaborating and took time to pursue their own sounds and ideas. They reunited in 2016 after seeing the positive reaction to re-posts of some of their past work on various social media outlets.

Musical style and influences
Much of the group's work is in the style of melodic progressive house, and their influences in electronic music include BT, Daft Punk, and Tiesto. Adam is an accomplished studio engineer and played drums in several local bands during high school. He has worked with many local and international artists in a wide variety of musical genres. Soha has been playing professionally since age 15 and is a seasoned musician in the genres of jazz, blues, funk, soul and rock. He is well-versed in traditional Persian instruments and he acknowledges his heritage as a key influence on his melodies and songwriting.

Members
 Adam Kershen – DAW, production, keyboards
 Soha Radjpoust – DAW, production, keyboards

Discography

Extended plays

Singles

Remixes
 2007: Something About You (Adam K. & Soha Remix) - Hatiras
 2008: Deep At Night (Adam K. & Soha Remix) - Ercola and Heikki L
 2008 - 4 AM (Adam K. & Soha Remix) - Kaskade
 2008 - Break My Fall (Adam K, Pettigrew, and Soha Remix) - Tiësto featuring BT
 2008 - Cities In Dust (Adam K. & Soha Remix) - Junkie XL
 2008 - Energy Bomb / Xtravaganza Ibiza 2008 (Adam K. & Soha Remix) - Alex Gold
 2008 - Underlying Feeling (Adam K. & Soha Remix) - Sylvia Tosun
 2008 - We Hold On (Adam K. & Soha Remix) - Kaz James
 2008 - Come Fly Away (Adam K. & Soha Remix) - Benny Benassi featuring Channing
 2009 - Take Me With You (Adam K. & Soha Club Mix) - Serge Devant featuring Emma Hewitt
 2009 - The Rose of Jericho (Adam K. & Soha Remix) - BT
 2009 - Bruised Water (Adam K. & Soha Club Mix) - Chicane and Natasha Bedingfield
 2009 - Major Tom (Coming Home) (Adam K. & Soha Club Edit) - Shiny Toy Guns
 2009 - Need To Feel Loved (Adam K. & Soha Vocal Mix) - Reflekt featuring Delline Bass
 2009 - Magnificent (Adam K. & Soha Club Mix) - U2
 2010 - I'm Back Again (Adam K. & Soha Mix) - Pete Tha Zouk, Abigail Bailey and Mastercris
 2010 - Loneliness 2010 (Adam K. & Soha Remix) - Tomcraft
 2010 - In The Music (Adam K. & Soha Remix) - Deepswing
 2011 - Wake Up (Adam K. & Soha Remix) - Adam K. featuring Naan
 2013 - Soulmate (Adam K. & Soha Remix) - Natasha Bedingfield
 2014 - You're Not Alone (Adam K. & Soha Remix) - Adam K.
 2016 - Never Coming Home (Adam K. & Soha Remix) - Fwlr featuring Kinley

References

Canadian dance music groups
Canadian electronic music groups
Musical groups from Toronto
Canadian DJs
Canadian house musicians
Progressive house musicians
Electronic dance music DJs